Eudactylota barberella is a moth of the family Gelechiidae. It is found in Mexico and the United States, where it has been recorded from Arizona, Colorado and New Mexico.

The wingspan is 11–14 mm. The forewings are brown, red brown, grey brown, grey white and white with many scales with purple reflections. The hindwings are pale fuscous, shining orange.

References

Moths described in 1903
Gelechiini